Ponteilla is a commune in the Pyrénées-Orientales department in southern France.

Geography 
Ponteilla is located in the canton of Les Aspres and in the arrondissement of Perpignan.

Population

Sites of interest 
 Jardin exotique de Ponteilla

See also
Communes of the Pyrénées-Orientales department

References

Communes of Pyrénées-Orientales